Main Building, also known as "Old Main," is a historic building located on the former campus of West Virginia University Institute of Technology at Montgomery, Fayette County, West Virginia. It was built in 1895–1897.  In 1898 and 1905, two-story wings were attached to each side of the original unit. The total length is 207 feet. It features a projecting three story, square entrance tower with a slate covered hipped roof.

It was listed on the National Register of Historic Places in 1980.

References

University and college buildings on the National Register of Historic Places in West Virginia
School buildings completed in 1897
Buildings and structures in Fayette County, West Virginia
National Register of Historic Places in Fayette County, West Virginia
University and college administration buildings in the United States
Victorian architecture in West Virginia